Funky Barn, known as Funky Barn 3D on the Nintendo 3DS, is a farm simulation video game developed by Tantalus Interactive and published by Ubisoft and 505 Games for the Nintendo 3DS and Wii U consoles respectively.

Gameplay
Gameplay is similar to that of the Story of Seasons series or Shepherd's Crossing.
The Player can choose between two game modes: the main game or challenge farms. In the main game players start their own farm while getting new items and animals over time. in the challenge mode they fix up an abandoned farm in extreme disrepair.

Reception
Funky Barn received mixed reviews upon release; the Wii U version currently holds a rating of 50/100 on Metacritic and a 50.83% on GameRankings, based on 10 and 12 reviews, respectively. The 3DS version received similar reception, holding a 55% on Game Rankings based on 2 reviews.

References

2012 video games
Ubisoft games
Farming video games
Wii U games
Nintendo 3DS games
Video games developed in Australia
Simulation video games
505 Games games
Tantalus Media games